The West Bromwich by-election of 24 May 1973 was held after the appointment of Labour Member of Parliament (MP) Maurice Foley to the European Commission. Held continuously by Labour since 1935 it was retained in this by-election.

Campaign
The election campaign was noted for the refusal of Enoch Powell, MP for neighbouring Wolverhampton South West, to endorse Conservative candidate David Bell as he felt that Bell was too far removed from his own policies on immigration and United Kingdom membership of the European Community. Although Powell did not endorse any candidate the National Front claimed that Powell's refusal to support Bell represented tacit endorsement. As a consequence Martin Webster captured 16% of the vote, an all-time high for the NF to save its deposit.

In common with a number of by-elections at the time the Liberal Party did not compete for this seat.

Results

See also 
 West Bromwich (UK Parliament constituency)
 1941 West Bromwich by-election
 1963 West Bromwich by-election
 The town of West Bromwich
 Lists of United Kingdom by-elections

References

Politics of Sandwell
By-elections to the Parliament of the United Kingdom in West Midlands (county) constituencies
By-elections to the Parliament of the United Kingdom in Staffordshire constituencies
West Bromwich by-election
West Bromwich by-election
West Bromwich by-election
20th century in Staffordshire